Mrs Balbir Singh (1912 – 1994) was an Indian chef, cookery teacher and cookbook author. Her formal cooking and homemaking classes began in New Delhi in 1955, and her award-winning Mrs Balbir Singh’s Indian Cookery book, was first published in London in 1961 to much acclaim and inspired future generations of Indian chefs and cookery authors.

Professional life
Born in the Punjab, Singh was a pioneer in teaching and writing about the art of cookery in India. Well known chefs, including author, food writer and broadcaster Simon Majumdar, a judge on the Food Network, regard her as the Julia Child or Mrs. Beeton of India. After graduating cooking school in London in 1955, Singh returned to India to start her cookery and homemaking classes in New Delhi that same year. She taught cookery for over four decades and became an expert on the history, culture and science of regional and local Indian cuisine. Her signature style of detailed recipes and precise methods were applied to dishes for all occasions including family meals, dinner parties, and celebratory feasts.

In 1961, she penned what went on to become her enduring legacy to India's culinary heritage, Mrs. Balbir Singh’s Indian Cookery, an internationally acclaimed book which became the center point of authentic Indian cooking for subsequent generations of homemakers and chefs alike. The book went on to sell hundreds of thousands of copies worldwide, and went through several revisions, recipe additions, and reprints over the years.

Her classes became so popular, that in many circles they were a prerequisite for those considering marriage. Singh was also the first cookery expert to be commissioned by India's public service national television network, Doordarshan, to present a series of instructional cooking segments and shows.

Notable recipes
Although many of her recipes were award-winning, a particular recipe of Singh's was also an inspiration for the world's most popular Indian dish, Chicken Tikka Masala. Ethnic food historians and authors Peter & Colleen Grove discuss various origin claims of Chicken Tikka Masala in Appendix Six of their Flavours of History, in which one of their conclusions suggests that "The shape of things to come may have been a recipe for Shahi Chicken Masala in Mrs. Balbir Singh’s 'Indian Cookery' published in 1961."

Later life and legacy

In the latter part of her life, Singh combined her decades of experience with the then new desire of Indians for international cookery, without making a departure from the traditional, and always mindful to utilise produce and ingredients available in local markets, to present more than 300 recipes in her 1994, Continental Cookery for Indian Homes.

The book served not only as a kitchen companion to her book on Indian cuisine, but also added to her culinary legacy, as a reference and roadmap to Indian households wishing to broaden their daily food horizons. According to the book's Acknowledgements section, Singh was also inspired to complete it for her only grandchild Pallavi, a then new bride, "so that this would be her first wedding gift".

Of the many hundreds of alumni from Singh's cookery classes, a large number have gone on to pass on their knowledge in the professional cooking world, and their teacher's inspiration and influence can be seen in many subsequent and modern-day Indian cookbook authors, restaurateurs, and cookery teachers. Her dishes continue to be experienced and enjoyed by lovers of authentic Indian food around the world.

Awards and honours
In 1959, Singh was awarded the Indian Council of Agricultural Research's Award in recognition of her work highlighting the benefits of home preservation.

Works
 Mrs. Balbir Singh's Indian Cookery (1961), and subsequent revisions and reprints
 Continental Cookery for Indian Homes (1994)

References

 The Flavors of History, (From corn to chilli to curry)  by Peter & Colleen Grove
 Mrs. Balbir Singh's Indian Cookery, 1961
 Continental Cookery for Indian Homes, by Mrs. Balbir Singh, 1994

Further reading
Taylor Sen, Colleen (1 January 2004) "Food Culture in India (Food Culture Around the World)", Greenwood Publishing Group
Collingham, Lizzie (6 February 2006) "Curry: A Tale of Cooks and Conquerors", Oxford University Press
Walker, Harlan (1991) "Oxford Symposium on Food and Cookery 1991", Prospect Books
Dhillon, Sukhraj S. (17 September 2010) "Health, Happiness, and Longevity: Eastern and Western Approach", Amazon and Barnes & Noble
Davidson, Alan  (1 August 2014) "The Oxford Companion to Food", Oxford University Press
Forbes Publications, (1976) "Home Economics, Volume 22"
Housecraft (1974) "Housecraft, Volumes 47-48"
 Collingham, Elizabeth M. (2005) "Curry: a biography", Chatto & Windus
Verlag, Gunter Narr (2006), "Journal for the Study of British Cultures, Volume 13"
"Himmat, Volume 5"
Sri Avinashilingam Home Science College for Women (1980) "The Indian Journal of Nutrition and Dietetics, Volume 17"

External links
 Personal website
 www.Facebook.com/mrsbalbirsinghofficial Facebook page

 
1912 births
1994 deaths
20th-century Indian women writers
20th-century Indian writers
Chefs of Indian cuisine
Cookbook writers
Punjabi people
People from New Delhi
Women writers from Delhi
Indian chefs
Women chefs
Indian food writers
Women cookbook writers